Gunnilbo Church is a church in Gunnilbo socken, Sweden. It was built between 1825 and 1835, and was inaugurated 4 October 1835.

References

19th-century Church of Sweden church buildings
Churches completed in 1835
Churches in Västmanland County
Churches in the Diocese of Västerås